Qi River is a river in southwest China's Guizhou and Chongqing.

Qi River flows through Tongzi County and Xishui County of Guizhou Province and Qijiang District, Jiangjin District, Nanchuan District and Banan District of Chongqing City.

Qi River's main tributaries include Xiangma River, Qixi River, Yangdu River, Zaodu River, Tonghui River, Sunxi River, and Wenshui River.

History

References

Tributaries of the Yangtze River
Rivers of Guizhou
Rivers of Chongqing